Edwin Balmer (July 26, 1883 – March 21, 1959) was an American science fiction and mystery writer.

Biography
Balmer was born in Chicago to Helen Clark (Pratt) and Thomas Balmer. In 1909, he married Katharine MacHarg, sister of the writer William MacHarg. After her death, he married Grace A. Kee in 1927.

He began as a reporter for the Chicago Tribune in 1903 before writing for books and magazines. He was editor of Redbook (1927–1949) and later became associate publisher. He would then commission young writers to write up these ideas for inclusion in Redbook.

He died on March 21, 1959 at age 75.

Novels
Together with author Philip Wylie, he wrote the catastrophe science fiction novels When Worlds Collide (1933) and After Worlds Collide (1934). The former was made into an award-winning 1951 movie by George Pal.

Balmer also wrote several detective novels and collaborated with William MacHarg on The Achievements of Luther Trant (1910), an early collection of detective short stories.

Comic strip
Balmer also helped create (with artist Marvin Bradley) the syndicated comic strip Speed Spaulding, partially based on the Worlds Collide series, which ran from 1938 through 1941 in the comic book Famous Funnies.

Bibliography

 1909 – Waylaid by Wireless
 1910 – The Achievements of Luther Trant with William MacHarg
 1910 – The Science of Advertising with counsel from Thomas Balmer
 1913 – The Surakarta with William MacHarg
 1915 – A Wild-Goose Chase
 1916 – The Blind Man's Eyes with William MacHarg
 1917 – The Indian Drum with William MacHarg
 1919 – Ruth of the U. S. A.
 1920 – Resurrection Rock
 1922 – The Breath of Scandal
 1923 – Keeban
 1924 – Fidelia
 1925 – That Royle Girl
 1927 – Dangerous Business, filmed as Party Girl in 1930
 1927 – Flying Death
 1932 – Five Fatal Words with Philip Wylie
 1933 – The Golden Hoard with Philip Wylie
 1933 – When Worlds Collide with Philip Wylie
 1934 – After Worlds Collide with Philip Wylie
 1934 – Dragons Drive You
 1936 – The Shield of Silence with Philip Wylie
 1941 – The Torn Letter
 1954 – In His Hands
 1956 – The Candle of the Wicked
 1958 – With All the World Away
 2013 – The Complete Achievements of Luther Trant (the 1910 book with 3 additional stories)

References
Citations

Bibliography

External links

 
 
 
 
 

1883 births
1959 deaths
20th-century American male writers
20th-century American novelists
American comics writers
American male novelists
American mystery writers
American science fiction writers
Redbook